Monroe is a masculine given name which may refer to:

People
 Monroe Althouse (1853–1924), American composer and bandmaster
 Monroe Baker (1821 or 1823–?), American politician, one of the first, possibly the first, African-American mayors in the United States
 Monroe Beardsley (1915–1985), American philosopher
 Monroe D. Donsker (1924–1991), American mathematician and a professor
 Monroe Evans, first Jewish mayor of Fayetteville, North Carolina, United States
 Monroe Hayward (1840–1899), American politician and senator
 Monroe Heath (1827–1894), American politician, mayor of Chicago, Illinois, United States
 Monroe Fein (1923–1982), US Navy lieutenant and captain of the Altalena in the 1948 Altalena Affair
 Monroe Karmin (1929–1999), American Pulitzer Prize-winning journalist
 Monroe Henry Kulp (1858–1911), American politician
 Monroe Alpheus Majors (1864–1960), American physician, writer and civil rights activist
 Monroe G. McKay (1928–2020), United States circuit judge
 Monroe Morton (1856–1919), African-American businessperson and postmaster
 Monroe Jackson Rathbone II (1900–1976), American businessman, chairman, president, and CEO of Standard Oil of New Jersey
 Monroe Minor Redden (1901–1987), American politician
 Monroe Rosenfeld (c. 1861–1918), American songwriter and journalist
 Monroe M. Shipe (1847–1924), American real estate developer and streetcar network operator

Fictional characters
 Monroe Ficus, in the American sitcom Too Close for Comfort
 Monroe, in the American television series Grimm
 Monroe, in the American animated television series The Life and Times of Juniper Lee (2005–2007)
 Monroe, main character of William Wray's comic strip Monroe, published in Mad magazine

English-language masculine given names